Søren Strunge is a Danish mountain bike orienteering competitor and World Champion. He won a silver medal in the middle distance at the 2008 World MTB Orienteering Championships, as well as a gold medal in the relay together with Lasse Brun Pedersen and Torbjørn Gasbjerg.

References

External links
 

Danish orienteers
Male orienteers
Danish male cyclists
Mountain bike orienteers
Year of birth missing (living people)
Living people
Place of birth missing (living people)